Mahesh Joshi (2 April 1939 – 9 April 2021) was an Indian politician and member of the Indian National Congress. He was born in Kushalgarh, Rajasthan. Joshi was a member of the Madhya Pradesh Legislative Assembly from the Indore-3 constituency in Indore. He was a member of Coordination committee of Madhya Pradesh Congress Committee.

See also
1980 Madhya Pradesh Legislative Assembly election
1985 Madhya Pradesh Legislative Assembly election
Indore-3 (Vidhan Sabha constituency)
Madhya Pradesh Congress Committee

References 

Politicians from Indore
Indian National Congress politicians from Madhya Pradesh
Madhya Pradesh MLAs 1980–1985
Madhya Pradesh MLAs 1985–1990
1939 births
2021 deaths